Hejian (alternative romanizations: Ho Dsien , Ho-kien[-fou]) is a county-level city under the administration of the prefecture-level city of Cangzhou, in the east-central part of Hebei province, China. Hejian is situated along China National Highway 106.

History

Séraphin Couvreur (1835–1919) and Léon Wieger (1856–1933), two French Jesuit missionaries and renowned Sinologists worked at the Catholic Jesuit mission in Hejian.

The county contains the tomb of Chinese president Feng Guozhang.

Administrative divisions
After changes in 2016, there were 2 subdistricts, 7 towns, and 11 townships:

Before changes in 2016, there were 7 towns and 13 townships:

Climate

References

External links
 Official site (Chinese)
 Facts on Hejian (English) 
 Old map of Hejian

 
County-level cities in Hebei
Cangzhou